The Irish League in season 1917–18 was suspended due to the First World War. A Belfast & District League was played instead by 6 teams, and Linfield won the championship.

League standings

Results

References
Northern Ireland - List of final tables (RSSSF)

1917-18
1917–18 in European association football leagues
Irish